Anita Bonds (born 1945) is an American Democratic politician in Washington, D.C. She is an at-large member of the Council of the District of Columbia. She served as the Chair of the District of Columbia Democratic Party from 2006 to 2018. She worked as an executive at Fort Myer Construction, a District contractor.

Early life
Bonds was raised in Southeast Washington, D.C. She attended college at University of California, Berkeley, where she majored in chemistry.

Career
Bonds helped run Marion Barry's first campaign for the District of Columbia Board of Education in 1971. She was elected Ward 2 delegate to the Black Political Convention in 1972. In 1973, Bonds ran in a special election for the Ward 2 seat on the District of Columbia Board of Education. Bill Treanor won the election with 62 percent of the vote. Bonds worked as ward and precinct coordinator for Clifford Alexander's campaign for District mayor in 1974. She served as deputy campaign manager for Barry's 1978 and 1982 bids for District mayor. In 1979, Mayor Barry named Bonds special assistant for constituent services.

Bonds served as manager of John L. Ray's reelection campaign for at-large councilmember in 1980. In 1983, Bonds was director of the District of Columbia Office of Community Services. She served on Jesse Jackson's presidential campaign in 1984. She was campaign manager for Barry's bid for a third term as District mayor in 1986.

In 1990, Bonds helped the defense attorney in Marion Barry's drug and perjury charges.  In 1994, Bonds became special assistant to District Mayor Sharon Pratt Kelly's chief of staff, Karen A. Tramontano. In May 1998, Bonds was named campaign manager for Councilmember Harold Brazil's bid for District mayor. In August 1998, she left that role after a campaign reorganization.

From 2004 to 2005, she served as director of the mayor's Office of Community Affairs. In 2005, she became  a senior adviser to Council member Kwame R. Brown.

When elected to the D.C. Council, Bonds worked as an executive for Fort Myer Construction, one of the district's largest contractors. Bonds said she would cut back on her hours when taking her seat on the Council but did not immediately sever ties with the company. She characterized questions about her outside employment as chauvinistic.

Councilmember

Election
In November 2012, Democrat Phil Mendelson won a special election to become the chair of the Council of the District of Columbia, creating a vacancy of his former seat as at-large member of the Council. District of Columbia law provides that, in the event of a vacancy of an at-large seat on the Council, the political party of the former incumbent shall decide who will fill the seat until a special election can be held.

Bonds announced that she would seek to be selected to hold the at-large Council seat. Douglass Sloan, a public affairs consultant and Advisory Neighborhood Commissioner for Riggs Park, and John Capozzi, former Shadow U.S. Representative and former at-large member of the District of Columbia Democratic State Committee, announced that they would also seek the selection. In a vote by the D.C. Democratic State Committee, Bonds received 55 of the 71 votes cast, winning the selection process. Bonds was sworn in as councilmember on December 11, 2012.

Bonds won reelection in the 2013 special election.

Service

Bonds introduced legislation to limit property taxes on senior citizens. Her bill exempted homeowners with a moderate income or lower who have lived in the District for 15 consecutive years.

In 2017, Bonds attended the parade for the inauguration of Donald Trump.

Bond won reelection in 2018 against a trio of challengers who were half her age. Most of her donors came from people and companies associated with DC's building industry.

In December 2019, Bonds was criticized in the media for revealing the identity of a whistleblower during a public hearing. She claimed the outing was accidental, but some D.C. government employees suggested on background that they believed it was an intentional act of retaliation.

In July 2020, Bonds opposed legislation that would have moved funds from the extension of the D.C. Streetcar to repair public housing. Earlier, Bonds made a statement saying she supported the budget change.

In October 2020, Bonds complained after activists from the advocacy group Sunrise Movement demonstrated in front of her home, protesting that she was not more supportive of affordable housing and her endorsement of a developer for a vacant at-large position on the DC Council. Bonds equated her treatment to other African Americans who suffered at the hands of the Ku Klux Klan.

Personal life
Bonds is widowed. She has one adult daughter, two adult sons, and seven grandchildren.

Election results

2012

2014

2018

Committees
Bonds currently serves on the following committees:
 Committee on Housing and Neighborhood Revitalization (Chair)
 Committee on the Judiciary and Public Safety
 Committee on Finance and Revenue
 Committee on Education
 Committee on Recreation and Youth Affairs

Bonds is also a former member of the Committee on Business and Economic Development.

References

|-

1945 births
21st-century American politicians
21st-century American women politicians
African-American people in Washington, D.C., politics
Living people
Members of the Council of the District of Columbia
UC Berkeley College of Chemistry alumni
Washington, D.C., Democrats
Washington, D.C., government officials
Women city councillors in the District of Columbia
21st-century African-American women
21st-century African-American politicians
20th-century African-American people
20th-century African-American women